Chambost-Longessaigne is a commune in the Rhône department in eastern France.

See also
 Communes of the Rhône department

References

Communes of Rhône (department)